Imma albotaeniana is a moth in the family Immidae. It was described by Christian Johannes Amandus Sauber in 1901. It is found on Java and the Philippines.

References

Moths described in 1901
Immidae
Moths of Asia